Stenochilus is a genus of Asian araneomorph spiders in the Stenochilidae family, and was first described by Octavius Pickard-Cambridge in 1871.  it contains three species, found in Asia: S. crocatus, S. hobsoni, and S. scutulatus. It is considered a senior synonym of Metronax

See also
 List of Stenochilidae species

References

Araneomorphae genera
Spiders of Asia
Stenochilidae
Taxa named by Octavius Pickard-Cambridge